Dmytro Zaderetskyi (born 3 August 1994) is a professional Ukrainian football defender.

Career
Zaderetskyi attended the Sportive youth school of Desna Chernihiv and UKF Kharkiv. He made his debut for FC Volyn Lutsk played as substituted in the game against FC Dynamo Kyiv on 14 July 2013 in Ukrainian Premier League.

In 2015 he moved on Desna Chernihiv, the main club of Chernihiv his home city. On 15 may 2016 he scored against Sumy in Ukrainian First League at the Yuvileiny Stadium in Sumy.

International career
He was called up for Ukraine-21 national team in 2014 by Volodymyr Horilyi.

Outside of professional football
According to the YouTube channel Bombardyr, during the Siege of Chernihiv, Dmytro Zaderetskyi, a former player of Desna Chernihiv and Volyn, is defending his hometown with weapons in his hands. According to the football player, all his relatives are currently in Chernihiv, in particular, his father works as a firefighter.

Career statistics

Club

International

Honours
Podillya Khmelnytskyi
 Ukrainian Second League: 2020–21

Polissya Zhytomyr 
 Ukrainian Second League: 2019-20

Kremin Kremenchuk
 Ukrainian Second League: 2018-19

References

External links 
 
 

1994 births
Living people
Footballers from Chernihiv
Ukrainian footballers
Ukrainian Premier League players
SDYuShOR Desna players
FC Volyn Lutsk players
FC Desna Chernihiv players
FC Kramatorsk players
FC Kremin Kremenchuk players
FC Polissya Zhytomyr players
FC Podillya Khmelnytskyi players
Association football defenders
Ukrainian First League players
Ukrainian Second League players
Ukraine under-21 international footballers